National Institute of Technology Sikkim (NIT Sikkim or NIT SKM) is a public engineering and research institution near the city of Ravangla in Sikkim, India. It is one of the 31 National Institutes of Technology in India and has been declared as an Institute of National Importance by the Government of India. It is an autonomous institute and functioning under the aegis of Ministry of Education (Shiksha Mantrayala), Government of India.

History 
National Institute of Technology, Sikkim is one among the ten newly sanctioned National Institutes of Technology by the Government of India under the 11th Five year Plan, 2009. NIT Sikkim started functioning in August, 2010.

Campus 

Currently, it is being operated from a temporary campus at the Barfung Block, Ravangla, Sub Division of South Sikkim. Ravangla campus is surrounded by great scenic beauty. It is likely to continue its activities at Ravangla Campus until its permanent campus comes up at Khamdong, Sikkim.

Academics 

All courses and examinations are conducted in the English language as the only mode of instruction. NIT Sikkim offers a 4-year Bachelor of Technology (B.Tech.) programme in various engineering fields, as well as a 2-year Master of Technology (M.Tech.) programmes and Ph.D. Programmes. Admission to undergraduate programmes is taken through JEE (Main). Admission to the postgraduate courses is through the GATE for Master of Technology (M.Tech.).

Departments 
Academic departments include:

Engineering
 Department of Civil Engineering
 Department of Computer Science and Engineering
 Department of Electrical and Electronics Engineering
 Department of Electronics and Communication Engineering
 Department of Mechanical Engineering

Sciences
 Department of Chemistry
 Department of Physics
 Department of Mathematics

Allied departments
 Department of Humanities and Social Sciences

Campus facilities 

Currently, it is operating from a temporary campus at Ravangla.

PARAM Kanchenjunga supercomputer 

NIT Sikkim is home to PARAM Kanchenjunga, one of the PARAM series of supercomputers. Unveiled in April 2016, it is the fastest supercomputer among NITs. Costing , it was built with collaboration of Centre for Development of Advanced Computing (C-DAC).

Library 

The institute has a central library which caters to all the academic needs of students. The library also subscribes to a number of scientific journals and magazines.

Internet accessibility 

The institute is part of the multi-gigabit National Knowledge Network (NKN), a National research and education network.
The academic buildings are all Wi-Fi enabled and they are connected through high speed LAN too. All the labs are also connected to the internet through high speed LAN. Almost all hostels are provided with internet facility through Wi-Fi or LAN and other hostels will also be provided in near future.

Auditorium 

An Auditorium is inside the campus for important occasions and cultural events.

Hostels 

The Institute provides boarding facilities to the students and the faculty members, on the campus. The Institute provides separate hostels for the male and female students with separate mess facilities.

Sports 

The institute has playgrounds with facilities for playing cricket, football, volleyball etc. It also has facilities to play badminton, table tennis etc.
The institution also hosts a number of intra-sports tournaments for its students which are handled by the student body of NIT Sikkim.
 Sports Week provides an opportunity for the students to participate in inter-department volleyball, football, table-tennis, badminton, chess and kho-kho tournaments as well as athletic events.
 Xplode Cricket Cup is the annual intra-NIT cricket tournament.

Labs 
The institute has well equipped labs for every department which facilitates the learning of a student giving her a practical approach. The computer labs are well facilitated with 105 systems in total with good LAN facility.
The other department labs also have good equipments in them.

Student activities
Extracurricular activities include an innovation cell, the community development society Aayas, mechanical engineer's society Yantrikaa, the Illuzion dance club and the photography club.

Recently, a new literary club, Regnant Ink got formed that organises various literary activities every week. The club was especially formed to hone and bring out the talents of the students. Declamation, writing, film making are all encouraged here.

NIT Sikkim students also hold an annual technology festival (fest) called Abhiyantran which was held for the first time in 2014, and a three-day socio-cultural fest called Udgam.

See also 

National Institutes of Technology
Ministry of Education(Shiksha Mantralaya)
Sikkim

References

External links
 

Educational institutions established in 2010
Education in Sikkim
Universities and colleges in Sikkim
Engineering colleges in Sikkim
2010 establishments in Sikkim